Vamp Show is a play performed in Japan in 2001 in the Parco Theatre in Shibuya, Tokyo, in 2001. It was directed by Ikeda Narushi.
It was written by Mitani Kōki and inspired by the German musical Tanz der Vampire. The only similarity in the two stories, however, is the topic of vampires.

Synopsis
A young lady arrives at a creepy train station to wait for a train to the city. Eventually five young men arrive to wait with her. It is revealed that they are vampires, and decide that if the young lady is to be allowed to live, she must also become a vampire as well. However, one of the five young men is only pretending to be a vampire, and tries to save her from her fate.

Cast
Sakai Masato
Saksaki Kuranosuke
Hashimoto Jun
Ito Toshihito
Kawahara Masahiko
Matsuo Reiko
Tezuka Toru

Availability
This play was released on DVD by Parco Thirdstage and E-Oshibai.

External links
Japanese Mitani Koki Parco Theatre Database

Vamp Show
2001 plays
Vampires in plays
Shibuya
Japanese horror fiction